The Chevron B1 was the first car to be developed and built by British manufacturer Chevron, in 1965. Designed by Derek Bennett, it was lightweight open-wheel sports car, specifically intended and purpose-built to compete in the clubman class series of racing; a series for front-engined sports prototypes. Over its five-year career span, it won 7 races, scored 18 podium finishes, won an additional 8 races in its class, and scored one single pole position. Only two car were built. It was constructed out of a steel tubular spaceframe chassis, covered in aluminum body panels. This meant it was very light, weighing only . It was powered by a naturally-aspirated  Ford-Cosworth.

References

Chevron racing cars
Sports prototypes
Open wheel racing cars
Sports racing cars